Curtis "Curt" Melvin Harnett,  (born 14 May 1965) is a Canadian racing cyclist. He began cycling as a way to stay in shape for hockey. He competed in four Olympic Games, winning three medals, one silver and two bronze.

Harnett also has three medals from the Commonwealth Games and three medals from the Pan American Games. He held the world record for the 200 metre time trial for 11 years, bested in 2006 by Dutchman Theo Bos. After retiring from cycling in 1996, he attended the Sydney and Athens Olympic Games as a commentator for CBC Sports.

He was inducted into Canada's Sports Hall of Fame in 2005. Harnett was introduced into the Lehigh Valley Velodrome Cycling Hall of Fame. He was the chef de mission for Team Canada at the 2015 Pan American Games and the 2016 Summer Olympics.  In 2018, Harnett was made a Member of the Order of Canada.

Quotes 
 "It's time to get a haircut and get a real job." – After competing in his final Olympic Games. Harnett was noted for his distinctive long, very curly blond hair and even did a TV commercial for a shampoo.

References

External links 
Website

1965 births
Living people
Canadian male cyclists
Cycling announcers
Cyclists from Ontario
Cyclists at the 1984 Summer Olympics
Cyclists at the 1988 Summer Olympics
Cyclists at the 1992 Summer Olympics
Cyclists at the 1996 Summer Olympics
Cyclists at the 1987 Pan American Games
Medalists at the 1984 Summer Olympics
Medalists at the 1992 Summer Olympics
Medalists at the 1996 Summer Olympics
Members of the Order of Canada
Olympic bronze medalists for Canada
Olympic cyclists of Canada
Olympic medalists in cycling
Olympic silver medalists for Canada
Sportspeople from Toronto
Commonwealth Games silver medallists for Canada
Pan American Games gold medalists for Canada
Pan American Games bronze medalists for Canada
Commonwealth Games medallists in cycling
Pan American Games medalists in cycling
Cyclists at the 1990 Commonwealth Games
Cyclists at the 1994 Commonwealth Games
Medalists at the 1987 Pan American Games
Medallists at the 1990 Commonwealth Games
Medallists at the 1994 Commonwealth Games